George Macfarlan (1837/1838 – 9 October 1868) was a 19th-century Member of Parliament representing the Lyttelton electorate.

Professional career
Macfarlan was the only son of the Rev. George Macfarlan of Gainford, County Durham. He was educated at Shrewsbury School before attending Trinity College, Cambridge, where he obtained a "very high degree", passing his final exams in 1860 as fourteenth wrangler.

He moved to London to qualify as a lawyer, and was called to the bar by the Honourable Society of the Inner Temple in June 1863.

Macfarlan came out to Canterbury, New Zealand in January 1864. He was in partnership with William Sefton Moorhouse, prior to Moorhouse being elected Superintendent for the Canterbury Provincial Council in May 1866 for the second time, with their office located in Cathedral Square. After that, he was a solicitor with Macfarlan and Nottidge, also located in the central town square. He was an occasional contributor to the Lyttelton Times.

Political career

 

Macfarlan was elected in a 1 July 1867 by-election following the resignation of Edward Hargreaves. He represented the electorate for just over one year until his death.

Death
He died at the Wellington Club in Wellington from a fever at the young age of 30 years. He was buried at the Bolton Street Cemetery in Wellington. His funeral was attended by about 30 Members of both Houses of Parliament. His grave, together with a large area of the Bolton Street Cemetery, was removed in the late 1960s / early 1970s to make way for the Wellington Urban Motorway. Macfarlan was not married.

References

1830s births
1868 deaths
Alumni of Trinity College, Cambridge
Members of the Inner Temple
Members of the New Zealand House of Representatives
People educated at Shrewsbury School
People from Christchurch
New Zealand MPs for Christchurch electorates
People from Gainford, County Durham
Burials at Bolton Street Cemetery
19th-century New Zealand politicians